Channa marulius (bullseye snakehead or great snakehead) is a large species of snakehead native to South Asia. Populations in Southeast Asia are now regarded as separate species.

Taxonomy

C. marulius—as traditionally defined—is a species complex. A study published in 2017 showed that C. pseudomarulius, formerly regarded as a synonym of C. marulius, is a valid species from the southern Western Ghats. A genetic study published the same year showed that C. marulius consisted of three clearly separated lineages (not counting the already separated C. pseudomarulius). One of these is C. aurolineata, revalidated in 2018 for the populations in drainages in Myanmar, Thailand, and non-natively in the United States (separated from the more western C. marulius by the Indo-Burman Ranges), and the other was described as a new species, C. auroflammea, from the Mekong basin in 2019.In India it is a widespread native fish. In South India, it is commonly found in reservoirs, in Pechipparai, Chittar, Manimuthar, Bhvani, and Mettur dams of Tamil Nadu, and Thenmalai, Neyyar, and Idukki dams of Kerala. It can also be found in the reservoirs of Himachal Pradesh, such as the Pong Dam (Maharana Pratap Sagar), where it is known locally as soal. C. marulius is commonly known as giant murrel. In Assam, it is locally known as xal (Assamese: শাল). In Andhra and Telangana, it is called korrameenu, and is quite common in lakes and reservoirs. In Sindh, the larger one is referred to as Shakur (Sindhi: شاڪُرُ) and the smaller one as Mukur (Sindhi: مُڪُرُ).

Culinary
Great snakehead is a fast-growing fish specie when compared to most of the others of the genus, and they are also suitable for intensive culture due to their air-breathing habit. They are being sold live and fetch high prices in the market, due to their excellent-tasting flesh and lack of fine bones.

References

External links
 
 
 Channa marulius - USGS

marulius
Fish described in 1822
Taxa named by Francis Buchanan-Hamilton